Pippa Crerar is a British journalist who is the political editor of The Guardian. She is best known for her reporting on Partygate, a political scandal which culminated in the resignation of Prime Minister Boris Johnson, during her tenure as the Daily Mirrors political editor from 2018 to 2022.

Early life
Crerar was born in Edinburgh, Scotland, in June 1976. She spent her childhood in Edinburgh and in Glasgow, where she attended The Glasgow Academy. Her father ran a printing company and her mother is an academic. Crerar attended Newcastle University, where she studied English. She was a Scott Trust Bursary recipient on City University's postgraduate newspaper journalism course.

Career
Before joining the Daily Mirror, Crerar worked as Political Correspondent and City Hall editor for the Evening Standard throughout Boris Johnson’s tenure as London Mayor. She has also previously been deputy political editor at The Guardian, where she was a presenter of the Politics Weekly podcast. Crerar is a presenter of BBC Radio 4's programme The Week in Westminster, and has appeared regularly on The Andrew Marr Show, Politics Live, as well as weekly on Sky News.

Crerar was the Daily Mirrors political editor from 2018 to 2022. She was chair of the Parliamentary Press Gallery 2020/21.

In May 2020, Crerar revealed that Prime Minister Boris Johnson's special adviser Dominic Cummings had broken COVID-19 lockdown rules by travelling from London to County Durham while experiencing symptoms of the disease, and that he had been investigated by police. Cummings made a statement in the garden of 10 Downing Street acknowledging his movements, but retained his position.

In November 2021, Crerar published an article stating that a Christmas party had taken place in Downing Street in 2020, in contravention of lockdown rules. The article was followed by further articles in the Mirror, as well as content from other publications and broadcasters alleging further parties in what became known as Partygate. In December 2021, she published a photograph in the Mirror showing former Conservative London mayoral candidate Shaun Bailey at a Christmas party in December 2020. In January 2022, she published further articles on Partygate, including on "wine time" Fridays at Downing Street and a festive quiz. On January 25, the Metropolitan Police announced that it would investigate Downing Street parties during lockdown.

In March 2022, the British Journalism Review said of Crerar: "Our profession should ultimately be about only one thing: fearless truth-telling and truthful reporting, regardless of the consequences. She’s shown how the job should be done, and in the process played a major role in turning the Mirror back into a paper of which its legendary campaigning boss Hugh Cudlipp could feel proud".

Crerar became political editor of The Guardian in August 2022, succeeding Heather Stewart.

Awards
Crerar was Political Reporter of the Year at the Society of Editors' Press Awards 2020, where she also won Scoop of the Year. The judges said: "Crerar has had a fantastic year, showing tenacity, courage and persistence in her reporting". She won Scoop of the Year at the British Journalism Awards 2020 and at the London Press Club Awards 2020/21.

In popular culture

Crerar was portrayed by Jasmine Hyde in the sixth episode of the 2022 docudrama  This England.

References

Living people
British journalists
Daily Mirror people
The Independent people
London Evening Standard people
The Guardian journalists
British political journalists
BBC Radio 4 presenters
Alumni of Newcastle University
Year of birth missing (living people)